The Wycough–Jones House is a historic house at 683 Water Street in Batesville, Arkansas.  It is a two-story wood-frame structure, with a hip roof and weatherboard siding.  The front facade has a single-story porch extending across its width, and a smaller second-story porch above the main entrance, which is set in the center of three bays.  The outer bays have uniquely different projecting bays on both the first and second levels.  Built about 1878, it is one of the few remaining Victorian-era homes that remains in Batesville.

The house was listed on the National Register of Historic Places in 1975.

See also
National Register of Historic Places listings in Independence County, Arkansas

References

Houses on the National Register of Historic Places in Arkansas
Houses in Batesville, Arkansas
National Register of Historic Places in Independence County, Arkansas
Victorian architecture in Arkansas
Houses completed in 1878
1878 establishments in Arkansas